The Four Nations tournament (or the IV Nations tournament) was a rugby union competition among four national representative teams. The competition was last held in 2006. Both the Belgium and Spain national rugby union teams compete in the tournament, as well as amateur XVs from both France and Wales. The winner of the inaugural tournament was Belgium, who defeated Spain in the main final.

Results

Semifinals

Third Place Final

Final

See also
FIRA - Association of European Rugby

External links
Belgium shock Spain on planet-rugby.com
4 Nations tournament on fira-aer-rugby.com

International rugby union competitions hosted by Belgium
2006 rugby union tournaments for national teams
2006–07 in French rugby union
2006–07 in Welsh rugby union
2006–07 in Spanish rugby union
2006–07 in Belgian rugby union